The 64th parallel south is a circle of latitude that is 64 degrees south of the Earth's equatorial plane. It crosses the Southern Ocean and the Antarctic mainland, the latter as the most northern latitude.

At this latitude the sun is visible for 21 hours, 01 minutes during the December solstice and 4 hours, 12 minutes during the June solstice.

Around the world
Starting at the Prime Meridian and heading eastwards, the parallel 64° south passes through:

{| class="wikitable plainrowheaders"
! scope="col" width="125" | Co-ordinates
! scope="col" | Continent or ocean
! scope="col" | Notes
|-
| style="background:#b0e0e6;" | 
! scope="row" style="background:#b0e0e6;" rowspan="4" | Southern Ocean
| style="background:#b0e0e6;" | South of the Atlantic Ocean
|-
| style="background:#b0e0e6;" | 
| style="background:#b0e0e6;" | South of the Indian Ocean
|-
| style="background:#b0e0e6;" | 
| style="background:#b0e0e6;" | South of the Pacific Ocean
|-
| style="background:#b0e0e6;" | 
| style="background:#b0e0e6;" | South of the Atlantic OceanPassing just north of Brabant Island, Antarctica
|-
| 
! scope="row" | Antarctica
|-
| style="background:#b0e0e6;" | 
! scope="row" style="background:#b0e0e6;" | Southern Ocean
| style="background:#b0e0e6;" | South of the Atlantic Ocean
|}

See also
63rd parallel south
65th parallel south

References

s64